Little Sea were an Australian pop-rock band formed in late 2013, signed to Sony Music Australia. Based in Sydney, Australia, the band consisted of Andy Butler (lead vocals, guitar), Oliver Kirby (guitar), Dylan Clark (bass, piano), and Leighton Cauchi (drums). The Band have three extended plays, 'Wake the Sun' (2014), 'With You, Without You' (2015), and 'On Loop' (2016). Little Sea were managed by Luke Girgis of Be Like Children.

They separated on September 26, 2016.

History 
The group formed when Andrew Butler and Leighton Cauchi met through mutual friends and played in a progressive metal band. They later formed a new band and were joined by Oliver Kirby in late 2013 and starting posting covers on YouTube. Dylan Clark completed the line-up in February 2014.

The band's first single, "Thank You", was released in May, following which, the band toured Australia, including a support slot for 5 Seconds of Summer at the Enmore Theatre and the Trivoli. In July, the group was signed to Careless Management, and released the EP Wake the Sun, which debuted at number 1 on the Australian iTunes album chart.

This led to the group signing to Universal Music Publishing. They are now signed with Sony Music Australia. Little Sea supported 5 Seconds of Summer on the Australian leg of their tour in 2014.

In April 2015, Little Sea joined the Australian national Amplify tour, which also featured YouTube acts Troye Sivan, Connor Franta, Andrea Russett, Jai Waetford and Jamie's World amongst others.

In 2015, the band released the single "Change for Love" along with an EP, With You Without You. The EP consists of 6 tracks: "Red Lights", "Change for Love", "I Don't Wanna Leave", "Friends", an acoustic version of "I Don't Wanna Leave" and "Back to You". On 1 July 2015, Little Sea began their Australian headline tour.

In 2016, the band released the Ep 'On Loop'. Shortly after on September 26, 2016, the band announced their breakup on all of their social medias.

Discography

Extended plays

Singles

Awards and nominations

Channel V

References

Australian rock music groups